Arnis Mednis (born 18 October 1961) is a Latvian singer. He represented Latvia at the Eurovision Song Contest 2001 in Denmark with the song, "Too Much", and finished in 18th place out of the 23 competing nations, with 16 points.

References 

1961 births
Living people
Eurovision Song Contest entrants of 2001
Eurovision Song Contest entrants for Latvia
21st-century Latvian male singers
Latvian pop singers
20th-century Latvian male singers